Sayville High School is located in West Sayville, New York. The high school has around 1,000 students, 50% male and 50% female.

Notable alumni
Jack Coan, NFL Quarterback Indianapolis Colts
Chris Reccardi, animator
Andrew Garbarino, politician
Melissa Joan Hart, actress

References

Public high schools in New York (state)
Schools in Suffolk County, New York